Bicyclus safitza, the common bush brown or common savanna bush brown, is a butterfly of the family Nymphalidae. It is found in all of Africa south of the Sahara. Its preferred habitat is forests and other well-wooded habitats.

The wingspan is 40–45 mm for males and 43–48 mm for females. Adults are on wing year round.

The larvae feed on various grasses, including Ehrharta erecta.

Subspecies and forms
B. s. safitza – south of Sahara except Ethiopia
wet-season form, f. safitza – south to Mpumalanga, South Africa
wet-season form, f. injusta – South African east coast regions
dry-season form, f. evenus – widespread
B. s. aethiops (Rothschild & Jordan, 1905) – Ethiopia

References

Elymniini
Butterflies described in 1850